Harrison and Barrison (Hungarian: Harrison és Barrison) is a 1917 Hungarian silent comedy film directed by Alexander Korda and starring Márton Rátkai, Dezsõ Gyárfás and Nusi Somogyi. Korda broke from his previous practice of adapting literary works, to direct an original screenplay. The film's style is a madcap one, which relied on the talents of its two stars Rátkai and Gyárfás who were popular comedians. It was Korda's most famous Hungarian film, better known than his literary adaptions. Korda himself considered the film his best work of the period.

Cast
 Márton Rátkai   
 Dezső Gyárfás   
 Nusi Somogyi   
 Manci Dobos   
 Károly Lajthay  
 Ilona Bánhidy   
 Árpád id. Latabár

References

Bibliography
 Kulik, Karol. Alexander Korda: The Man Who Could Work Miracles. Virgin Books, 1990.
 Liehm, Mira & Liehm, Antonín J. The Most Important Art: Eastern European Film After 1945. University of California Press, 1977.

External links

1917 films
Hungarian silent films
Hungarian comedy films
1910s Hungarian-language films
Films directed by Alexander Korda
Hungarian black-and-white films
Austro-Hungarian films
1917 comedy films